Legio I Minervia ( First Legion "Minervan", i.e., "devoted to the goddess Minerva") was a legion of the Imperial Roman army founded in AD 82 by emperor Domitian (r. 81–96), for his campaign against the Germanic tribe of the Chatti. Its cognomen refers to the goddess Minerva, the legion's protector. There are still records of the I Minervia in the Rhine border region in the middle of the 4th century. The legion's emblem is an image of goddess Minerva.

Legio I Minervia first, and main, camp was in the city of Bonna (modern Bonn), in the province of Germania Inferior. In 89, they suppressed a revolt of the governor of Germania Superior. Due to this, Domitian gave them the cognomen Pia Fidelis Domitiana (loyal and faithful to Domitian) to acknowledge their support.

History

Between 101 and 106, the legion fought the Dacian Wars of emperor Trajan, commanded by Hadrian, the future emperor. The emblem with Minerva figure appears on the column of Trajan in Rome, along with symbols of other legions. After this war, I Minervia returned to its home city of Bonna. Together with XXX Ulpia Victrix, stationed close by in Castra Vetera II (modern Xanten), they worked in numerous military and building activities, even extracting stone from quarries.

Although it belonged to the Germanic army and Bonn was its camp, vexillationes (subunits) of the legion were allocated in different parts of the Empire:
 162–166 war against the Parthian Empire, commanded by emperor Lucius Verus
 166–175 and 178–180 war against the Marcomanni, commanded by emperor Marcus Aurelius
 173 campaign against the Chauci of Gallia Belgica, commanded by governor Didius Julianus
 198–211 garrison of the city of Lugdunum, capital of Gallia

During the civil wars of the late 2nd and 3rd century, I Minervia supported the following emperors (each of them gave them the indicated titles, dropped out after their fall):
 Septimius Severus
 Elagabalus (Antoniniana)
 Alexander Severus (Severiana Alexandriana)
 the Gallic Empire, that existed between 260 and 274

Around 353, Bonna was destroyed by the Franks. Although Legio I Minervia disappears from recorded history, there is no account of its end, whether destroyed in battle or simply disbanded.

Attested members

See also

List of Roman legions
Roman legion

References

External links
 livius.org article on Legio I Minervia
  Legio I Minervia Pia Fidelis, German re-enactment group
 , German re-enactment group, reenacting not only the Legio I Minervia.

01 Minervia
82 establishments
Chatti
Military units and formations established in the 1st century
80s establishments in the Roman Empire
80s establishments